The Canton of Sevran is a French administrative division, located in the arrondissement of Le Raincy, in the Seine-Saint-Denis département (Île-de-France région). Its borders were modified at the French canton reorganisation which came into effect in March 2015. Its seat is in Sevran.

Composition 
It consists of the following communes:
 Sevran
 Villepinte

Adjacent cantons 
 Canton of Tremblay-en-France (east)
 Canton of Aulnay-sous-Bois (west)
 Canton of Livry-Gargan (south)

See also
Cantons of the Seine-Saint-Denis department
Communes of the Seine-Saint-Denis department

References

Sevran